Treasure EP.1: All to Zero is the debut EP by South Korean boy band Ateez. It was released on October 24, 2018, with "Pirate King" and "Treasure" serving as the album's singles. It reached number seven on the Gaon Album Chart and sold 57,777 copies in South Korea.

Track listing

Charts

References 

2018 EPs
Ateez albums